Vanyo Ivanov (Bulgarian: Ваньо Иванов; born 9 May 2000) is a Bulgarian footballer who plays as a defender for Sportist Svoge.

References

External links
 

2000 births
Living people
Bulgarian footballers
Association football defenders
FC Vitosha Bistritsa players
FC Montana players
FC Sportist Svoge players
First Professional Football League (Bulgaria) players
People from Berkovitsa